Claudiomiro Estrais Ferreira (3 April 1950 – 24 August 2018), better known as just Claudiomiro, was a Brazilian football forward who played for several Série A clubs.

Career
Born in Porto Alegre, Rio Grande do Sul, Claudiomiro played for several Série A clubs, and he scored Estádio Beira-Rio's first goal on April 6, 1969. He won the Campeonato Gaúcho six times with Internacional.

National team
He played six games for the Brazil national team in 1971. He scored his only goal on July 24, 1971, against Paraguay.

Honors

Club
Internacional
Campeonato Gaúcho: 1969, 1970, 1971, 1972, 1973, 1974

References

1950 births
2018 deaths
Footballers from Porto Alegre
Brazilian footballers
Brazil international footballers
Association football forwards
Sociedade Esportiva e Recreativa Caxias do Sul players
Esporte Clube Novo Hamburgo players
Sport Club Internacional players
CR Flamengo footballers
Botafogo de Futebol e Regatas players